Rienk Johannes Mast (born 19 July 2001) is a Dutch college basketball player for the Bradley Braves. He is a current member of the Dutch national basketball team.

Early career
After playing korfball first as a kid, Mast switched to basketball for the club Celeritas-Donar from Groningen. After a couple of years, he changed teams to RTC Noord where he was coached by Marco van den Berg. As a youngster, Mast received offers for Real Madrid Baloncesto to play in their program.

Professional and college career

Donar

2017–18: Rookie season
Mast played his first professional seasons for Donar, as he was added to the roster for the 2017–18 season. When Mast played his first game, he was 16 years old. On 1 February 2018, Mast scored 24 points in a NBB Cup game against Racing Beverwijk, which made him the youngest top scorer for Donar in history. In the 2017–18 season, Mast started in 3 of the 29 games he played for Donar and averaged 3.6 points and 2.0 rebounds in the Dutch Basketball League. He played two games in the continental fourth-tier FIBA Europe Cup competition.

2018–19: Breakthrough season
In the 2018–19 season, Mast had his breakthrough season. Because of personnel changes within Donar and American players leaving, Mast was given a place in the starting five from January. On 12 January, he scored a career-high 30 points in a 101–67 win against BAL Weert. In April 2019, he was awarded the DBL MVP Under 23 award, as well as the DBL Most Improved Player award.

Bradley
On 21 January 2019, it was announced that Mast committed to Bradley University, where he will play for the Braves. He redshirted his freshman season. As a redshirt freshman, Mast averaged 8.6 points and 5.9 rebounds per game. He was named to the Third-team All-Missouri Valley Conference as a sophomore.

International career

Youth teams
In 2017, Mast played for the under-16 and the under-18 Netherlands national basketball team. He played at the 2017 FIBA Europe Under-16 Championship Division B, where he reached the final and made the tournament All-Star Team. Mast averaged 11.9 points, 10.1 rebounds and 1.4 assists per game.

In 2018, Mast won the 2018 FIBA Europe Under-18 Championship Division B while being the captain of the Dutch under-18 team. On January 21, he committed to play for the Bradley Braves in NCAA.

Senior team
On November 16, 2018, Mast was selected by head coach Toon van Helfteren to be a part of the Netherlands senior team for the first time. On November 29, 2018, Mast made his debut for the Netherlands in a 78–105 loss to Poland.

Honors

Club
Dutch Basketball League (1): 
2017–18
Dutch Cup (1): 
2017–18

Individual awards
DBL MVP Under 23: 2019
DBL Most Improved Player: 2019
DBL All-Rookie Team: 2018
2017 FIBA Europe Under-16 Championship Division B All-Star Team: 2017

Career statistics

College

|-
| style="text-align:left;"| 2019–20
| style="text-align:left;"| Bradley
| style="text-align:center;" colspan="11"|  Redshirt
|-
| style="text-align:left;"| 2020–21
| style="text-align:left;"| Bradley
| 28 || 19 || 23.5 || .484 || .359 || .724 || 5.9 || 1.3 || .3 || .5 || 8.6
|- class="sortbottom"
| style="text-align:center;" colspan="2"| Career
| 28 || 19 || 23.5 || .484 || .359 || .724 || 5.9 || 1.3 || .3 || .5 || 8.6

References

External links
Bradley Braves bio

2001 births
Living people
Bradley Braves men's basketball players
Donar (basketball club) players
Dutch expatriate basketball people in the United States
Dutch Basketball League players
Dutch men's basketball players
Power forwards (basketball)
Sportspeople from Groningen (city)